The 1998 AFL Ansett Australia Cup was the Australian Football League competition played in its entirety before the Australian Football League's 1998 Premiership Season began. It culminated the final in March 1998. The competition was sometimes referred to as the pre-season cup because it is played in its entirety before the AFL Premiership Season begins.

Games

Round of 16

|- style="background:#ccf;"
| Home team
| Home team score
| Away team
| Away team score
| Ground
| Crowd
| Date
| Local Time
| AEDT Time
|- style="background:#fff;"
| Carlton
| 11.8 (74) 
| North Melbourne
| 17.17 (119)
| North Hobart Oval 
| 9,563
| Saturday 21 February 1998
| 2:00 PM
| 2:00 PM
|- style="background:#fff;"
| Brisbane
| 18.17 (125)
| Fremantle
| 16.7 (103)
| Newlands Cricket Ground, Cape Town, South Africa
| 10,123
| Sunday, 22 February 1998
| 2:00 PM
| 11:00 PM
|- style="background:#fff;"
| Adelaide
| 17.10 (112)
| Richmond
| 15.18 (108)
| Football Park
| 17,923
| Monday, 23 February 1998 
| 8:00 PM
| 8:30 PM
|- style="background:#fff;"
| West Coast
| 13.12 (90)
| Collingwood
| 5.6 (36)
| Subiaco
| 17,535
| Wednesday, 25 February 1998
| 5:00 PM
| 8:00 PM
|- style="background:#fff;"
| Port Adelaide
| 14.15 (99)
| St. Kilda
| 18.11 (119)
| Football Park
| 17,024
| Friday 27 February 1998 
| 8:00 PM
| 8:30 PM
|- style="background:#fff;"
| Hawthorn
| 7.10 (52)
| Essendon
| 19.11 (125)
| Waverley Park
| 34,536
| Saturday, 28 February 1998
| 8:00 PM
| 8:00 PM
|- style="background:#fff;"
| Sydney
| 14.9 (93)
| Melbourne
| 15.15 (105)
| Basin Reserve, Wellington, New Zealand
| 7,820
| Sunday, 1 March 1998
| 2:00 PM
| 12:00 PM
|- style="background:#fff;"
| Geelong
| 12.9 (81)
| Western Bulldogs
| 22.12 (144)
| Waverley Park
| 10,509
| Monday, 2 March 1998
| 8:00 PM
| 8:00 PM

Quarter-finals

|- style="background:#ccf;"
| Home team
| Home team score
| Away team
| Away team score
| Ground
| Crowd
| Date
| Local Time
| AEDT Time
|- style="background:#fff;"
| Brisbane
| 18.17 (125)
| Adelaide
| 10.10 (70)
| Gabba
| 11,871
| Friday, 6 March 1998
| 7:00 PM
| 8:00 PM
|- style="background:#fff;"
| North Melbourne
| 16.14 (110)
| Essendon
| 8.15 (63)
| M.C.G.
| 30,850
| Saturday, 7 March 1998
| 8:00 PM
| 8:00 PM
|- style="background:#fff;"
| West Coast
| 10.4 (64)
| St. Kilda
| 24.18 (162)
| Waverley Park
| 15,817
| Sunday, 8 March 1998
| 8:00 PM
| 8:00 PM
|- style="background:#fff;"
| Melbourne
| 13.10 (88)
| Western Bulldogs
| 9.10 (64)
| Waverley Park
| 13,537
| Monday, 9 March 1998
| 8:00 PM
| 8:00 PM

Semi-finals

|- style="background:#ccf;"
| Home team
| Home team score
| Away team
| Away team score
| Ground
| Crowd 
| Date
| Local Time
| AEDT Time
|- style="background:#fff;"
|  Brisbane
| 8.7 (55) 
| North Melbourne
| 14.16 (100)
| Waverley Park
| 10,015
| Friday 13 March 1998 
| 8:00 PM
| 8:00 PM
|- style="background:#fff;"
| St. Kilda
| 15.12 (102)
| Melbourne 
| 9.11 (65)
| Waverley Park
| 28,054
| Saturday, 14 March 1998
| 8:00 PM
| 8:00 PM

Final

|- style="background:#ccf;"
| Home team
| Home team score
| Away team
| Away team score
| Ground
| Crowd
| Date
| Local Time
| AEDT Time
|- style="background:#fff;"
| North Melbourne
| 14.13 (97)
| St. Kilda
| 12.11 (83)
| Waverley Park
| 63,898
| Saturday 21 March 1998
| 8:05 PM
| 8:05 PM

Teams

Knock-Out Chart

Scorecard

Final Placings 
(Based on percentage in each individual round)

 St Kilda
 Melbourne 
 Brisbane 
 Western Bulldogs 
 Essendon 
 Adelaide
 West Coast 
 Richmond
 Sydney
 Port Adelaide 
 Fremantle 
 Carlton 
 Geelong 
 Hawthorn 
 Collingwood
DSQ: North Melbourne

See also

List of Australian Football League night premiers
1998 AFL season

References

http://www.users.on.net/~pwong/1998_ansettcup_r4.htm#Teams
https://web.archive.org/web/20130507051335/http://footystats.freeservers.com/Special/1998review.html

1998 Australian Football League season
Australian Football League pre-season competition